Northland Center for Advanced Professional Studies (CAPS) is a high school program which operates multiple different magnet programs for students who live within the school districts of: Excelsior Springs, Kearney, Liberty, North Kansas City, Park Hill, Platte County, and Smithville.

The center focuses on providing an education focused on building professional skills in partnership with local businesses and educational institutions.

Focus 
The center offers pre-professional, innovative and entrepreneurial education by immersing students in professional environments and employing a curriculum developed by industry professionals and program instructors.

Courses and Strands
 Digital Media and Design
 Engineering and Advanced Manufacturing
 Global Business and Entrepreneurship
 Global Logistics
 Medicine and Healthcare 
 Technology Solutions

CAPS Network
Northland CAPS is part of the CAPS Network that links other schools employing the CAPS program.
Affton Advanced Professional Studies (A@ps ), Affton School District, St. Louis County, Missouri
Alexandria Public Schools, Alexandria, MN
Blue Valley Center For Advanced Professional Studies, Overland Park, KS
Cedar Falls Schools, Cedar Falls, IA
ignite@psc - Bentonville Public Schools Professional Studies Center, Bentonville, AR
The Innovation Collaboratory - Elmbrook School District, Elmbrook, WI
GO CAPS, (Greater Ozarks Center for Advanced Professional Studies) - Participating GO CAPS districts include Bolivar, Branson, Logan-Rogersville, Monett, Nixa, Ozark, Reeds Spring, Republic, Springfield, Strafford and Willard.
Park City CAPS in Park City, Utah
Spark!, Parkway School District, St. Louis County, Missouri
MET Professional Academy, Peoria Unified School District in Glendale, Arizona
Minnesota Center for Advanced Professional Studies (MNCAPS), Lakeville Area Public Schools and Prior Lake-Savage Area Schools
Shakopee Public Schools, Shakopee, MN
Topeka Center for Advanced Learning and Careers, Topeka, Kansas
VANTAGE (Minnetonka Advanced Professional Studies) in Minnetonka, Minnesota
The School District of Washington located in Washington, MO
Westside CAPS, Westside Community Schools in Omaha, Nebraska.

See also
Secondary education
Profession

References

External links 
 

Public high schools in Missouri
Education in Kansas City, Missouri
Schools in Missouri
Special schools in the United States